Silvia Hunte Zambrano (born 14 April 1938) is a Panamanian sprinter. She competed in the women's 4 × 100 metres relay at the 1960 Summer Olympics. She finished second in the 1959 Pan American Games 4 × 100 metres relay (with Carlota Gooden, Jean Holmes-Mitchell, and Marcela Daniel).

References

1938 births
Living people
Athletes (track and field) at the 1960 Summer Olympics
Panamanian female sprinters
Olympic athletes of Panama
Athletes (track and field) at the 1959 Pan American Games
Pan American Games silver medalists for Panama
Pan American Games medalists in athletics (track and field)
Sportspeople from Panama City
Medalists at the 1959 Pan American Games
Central American and Caribbean Games medalists in athletics
Olympic female sprinters